Modern Drama is a peer-reviewed academic journal publishing studies of dramatic literature. It is published four times a year by the University of Toronto Press. It was founded in 1958 and largely focuses on literature of the 19th century onwards.

Abstracting and indexing
The journal is abstracted and indexed in:
 Academic Search Alumni Edition
 Academic Search Complete
 Academic Search Elite
 Academic Search Premier
 Academic Search Ultimate
 Arts and Humanities Citation Index
 Book Review Digest Plus
 Canadian Periodical Index
 Canadian Reference Centre
 Current Contents
 Current Contents—Arts and Humanities
 China Education Publications Import & Export Corporation (CEPIEC)
 CrossRef
 EJS EBSCO Electronic Journals Service
 Google Scholar
 Humanities Abstracts
 Humanities Full Text
 Humanities International Complete
 Humanities International Index
 Humanities Source
 Humanities Source Ultimate
 International Bibliography of Theatre and Dance
 Literary Reference Center
 Literary Reference Center Plus
 MasterFILE Complete
 MasterFILE Elite
 MasterFILE Premier
 Microsoft Academic Search
 MLA International Bibliography
 OmniFile Full Text Mega
 Project MUSE
 Scopus
 Ulrich’s Periodicals Directory

References

External links

 
 Modern Drama Journal archival papers held at the University of Toronto Archives and Records Management Services

University of Toronto Press academic journals
Quarterly journals
Publications established in 1958
English-language journals